Yoshiyuki Isomura (born 6 September 1955) is a Japanese professional golfer.

Isomura played on the Japan Golf Tour, winning once.

Professional wins (2)

Japan Golf Tour wins (1)

Japan Golf Tour playoff record (0–1)

Japan Challenge Tour wins (1)
1993 Korakuen Cup (1st)

Team appearances
World Cup (representing Japan): 1989

External links

Japanese male golfers
Japan Golf Tour golfers
1955 births
Living people